= Sangfor Technologies =

Chinese cybersecurity technology company

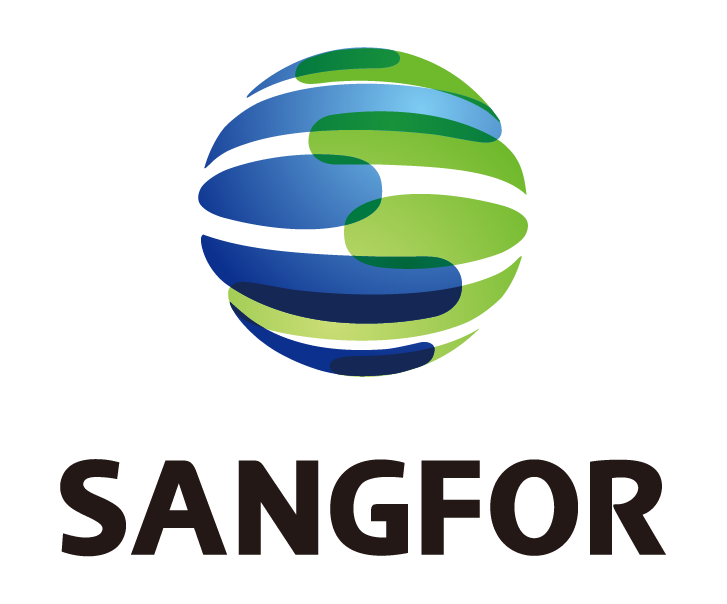
- Type: Public
- Industry: Information security
- Founded: 2000; 26 years ago
- Founders: He Zhaoxi
- Headquarters: China
- Key people: He Zhaoxi (Chairman)

Sangfor Technologies is a Chinese technology company operating in the fields of cybersecurity, cloud computing, and enterprise IT infrastructure. The company serves enterprise customers and is publicly listed on the Shenzhen Stock Exchange. The company was founded by He Zhaoxi, who serves as its chairman, and Xiong Wu.

== History ==
Sangfor Technologies was founded in 2000 in China by He Zhaoxi and Xiong Wu, graduates of the University of Science and Technology of China. The company began with a focus on network security technologies and later expanded its activities to include cloud-related and enterprise IT technologies. Sangfor Technologies has expanded its operations outside China and entered international markets through regional partnerships. As part of this expansion, the company collaborated with international IT distributors, including Tech Data, to distribute its cybersecurity-related offerings in Southeast Asia, including Indonesia.

Sangfor Technologies began its business with VPN (Virtual Private Network) products in the early 2000s. In the beginning the company focused on providing network security solutions for businesses. Later they expanded its product portfolio into other areas of cybersecurity and enterprise IT. In the following years, Sangfor moved into cloud computing and IT infrastructure solutions. In 2013, the company launched its “Desktop Cloud” product, which marked its entry into the cloud computing market. It later expanded into hyperconverged infrastructure (HCI), private cloud, hybrid cloud, and managed cloud services.

=== Initial Public Offering (2018) ===
On May 16, 2018, Sangfor completed an initial public offering on the Shenzhen Stock Exchange, raising approximately US$177 million.

== Products and Services ==
Sangfor provides network security and cloud computing infrastructure solutions. The company's products include EasyConnect, a remote access solution.

== Recognition and awards ==
- Sangfor Technologies was listed in Best cyber security company at the 2024 Cybersecurity Excellence Awards.
- In 2019, Sangfor Technologies was listed in Forbes China’s list of the 50 Most Innovative Companies.
- In 2018, Sangfor Technologies was ranked among the top 100 global cybersecurity companies in the 2018.
